The Nokia 6150 was a mobile phone released in 1998. It was an enhanced version of the Nokia 6110 - 6130: it could support both 900 MHz and 1800-1900 MHz GSM bands. The extra hardware required for dual-band capability (something uncommon for the era as transceivers were single-band initially) made the top side thicker than the 6110. The phone was used in the Mercedes-Benz S-Class (W220) (1998-2006 model), where it was held in a cradle and connected to the car's integrated car phone and media system called COMAND.

References

Mobile phones introduced in 1998
6150
Mobile phones with infrared transmitter